Joe Souleymane Dit Guyan Kanté (born 5 January 1982) is an Ivorian football goalkeeper playing for SOA.

Career 
Kanté began his career in the Académie de Sol Beni, before he was called up for ASEC Mimosas first squad and played with his team in the 2004 MTN Champions League. He left ASEC in January 2007 and moved to league side club Issia Wazi. For the 2009 season, Kanté joined the AS Denguélé. In 2010, Kanté will be playing for SOA.

International career
He was a member of the Ivory Coast national football team.

Personal life
Guyan is the older brother to Adama Kanté, who is also a football goalkeeper. In 2009, both played together for the same team, the AS Denguélé.

References

External links
 

1982 births
Living people
Ivorian footballers
Ivory Coast international footballers
ASEC Mimosas players
Issia Wazy players
AS Denguélé players
Société Omnisports de l'Armée players
Association football goalkeepers
Ligue 1 (Ivory Coast) players